The National Library of India is a library located in Belvedere Estate, Alipore, Kolkata, India. It is India's largest library by volume and public record. The National Library is under Ministry of Culture, Government of India. Currently, Dr. Prof. Ajay Pratap Singh working as Director General (additional) who is Director General of Raja Ram Mohan Roy Library Foundation, Kolkata since 2020. The library is designated to collect, disseminate and preserve printed material produced within India. With a collection in excess of 2.2 million books and records, it is the largest in the country. Before independence, it was the official residence of Governor-General of India.

The National Library is a result of the merging of the public library with the Imperial Library—several government libraries. The National Library (1953), then the Imperial Library housed several foreign (British) and Indian titles and was open to the public. It collects book, periodicals, and titles in virtually all the Indian languages while the special collections in the National Library of India house at least fifteen languages. The Hindi department has books that date back all the way to the nineteenth century and the first ever books printed in that language. The collections break down and consist of 86,000 maps and 3,200 manuscripts.

The Imperial Library 
The Imperial Library was formed in 1891   by combining a number of Secretariat libraries in Calcutta. Of those, the most important and interesting was the library of the Home Department, which contained many books formerly belonging to the library of East India College, Fort William and the library of the East India Board in London. But the use of the library was restricted to the superior officers of the Government. Sir Ashutosh Mukherjee was appointed as the president of imperial library council (1910)  to which he donated his personal collection of 80,000 books arranged in a separate section.

Declaring the Imperial Library as the National Library 

After independence the Government of India changed the name of the Imperial Library to the National Library by Imperial Library (Change of Name) Act, 1948, and the collection was transferred from The Esplanade to the present Belvedere Estate. On 1 February 1953 the National Library was opened to the public by Maulana Abul Kalam Azad. The name of National Library was changed to National Library of India by section 18 of the National Library of India Act, 1976.

Discovery of hidden chamber 
In 2010, the Ministry of Culture, the owner of the library, decided to get the library building restored by the Archaeological Survey of India (ASI). While taking stock of the library building, the conservation engineers discovered a previously unknown room. The secret ground-floor room, about 1000 sq. ft. in size, seems to have no opening of any kind.

The ASI archaeologists tried to search the first floor area (that forms the ceiling of the room) for a trap door, but found nothing. Since the building is of historical and cultural importance, ASI has decided to bore a hole through the wall instead of breaking it. There are speculations about the room being a punishment room used by Warren Hastings and other British officials, or a place to store treasure.

In 2011, the researchers announced that the room was filled entirely with mud, probably in an effort to stabilize the building.

Visiting 

The National Library is located on Belvedere Road in Alipore. It is open between 9 am and 8 pm on all working days and between 9.30 am and 6.00 pm on Saturdays, Sundays and Government of India holidays. It remains closed on three national holidays, 26 January (Republic Day), 15 August (Independence Day) and 2 October (Birthday of Mahatma Gandhi).

References

External links

National Library of India

India
Culture of Kolkata
Libraries in Kolkata
Buildings and structures in Kolkata
Education in Kolkata
Alipore